An oboe is a musical instrument of the woodwind family.

Oboe or OBOE may also refer to:

 Oboe (navigation), a World War II British aerial blind bombing targeting system
 Oboe (software), a digital music backup service from MP3tunes
 Off-by-one error (OBOE), a type of computer programming or mathematical error